The 2003 FIVB Volleyball World League was the 14th edition of the annual men's international volleyball tournament, played by 16 countries from 16 May to 13 July 2003. The Final Round was held in Madrid, Spain.

Pools composition

Intercontinental round
The top two teams in each pool will qualify for the Final Round. If the Final Round hosts Spain finish lower than second in their pool, they will still qualify along with the best three second teams across all four pools.

Pool A

|}

|}

Pool B

|}

|}

Pool C

|}

|}

Pool D

|}

|}

Final round
Venue:  Palacio Vistalegre, Madrid, Spain
All times are Central European Summer Time (UTC+02:00).

Pool play

Pool E

|}

|}

Pool F

|}

|}

Final four

Semifinals

|}

3rd place match

|}

Final

|}

Final standing

Awards
Best Scorer (Most Valuable Player)
  Ivan Miljković
Best Spiker
  Martin Lebl
Best Blocker
  Andrija Gerić
Best Server
  Andrija Gerić

References

External links
Official website

FIVB Volleyball World League
FIVB World League
2003
Sports competitions in Madrid
2003 in Madrid